USS Meade may refer to the following ships of the United States Navy:

 , a  commissioned in 1919; transferred to the Royal Navy as HMS Ramsey (G60), 1940
 , a  commissioned in 1942 and decommissioned in 1946.

United States Navy ship names